Pseudopecoelina is a genus of trematodes in the family Opecoelidae.

Species
Pseudopecoelina chirocentrosus Shen, 1986
Pseudopecoelina dampieriae Yamaguti, 1942
Pseudopecoelina elongata Hafeezullah, 1971
Pseudopecoelina platycephali Shen, 1986
Pseudopecoelina puriensis Ahmad, 1978
Pseudopecoelina stunkardi Ahmad, 1978
Pseudopecoelina xishaensis Gu & Shen, 1983

References

Opecoelidae
Plagiorchiida genera